Fendrich is a surname. Notable people with the surname include:

Fredric Fendrich (born 1988), Swedish footballer
Laurie Fendrich (born 1948), American artist, writer and educator
Mary Fendrich Hulman (1905–1998), Wife of the late Indiana industrialist Anton "Tony" Hulman, Jr. and matriarch of the Hulman-George family
Rainhard Fendrich (born 1955), Austrian singer, composer, entertainer and actor

See also 
Fendrich Cigar Company, Cigar factory in Evansville, Indiana